The RMIT (Royal Melbourne Institute of Technology) School of Science is an Australian tertiary education school within the College of Science Engineering and Health of RMIT University. It was created in 2016 from the former schools of Applied Sciences, Computer Science and Information Technology, and Mathematical and Geospatial Sciences.

See also
RMIT University

References

External links
School of Science

Health and Biomedical Sciences
Schools of mathematics
Computer science departments
Information technology schools